The 2011 ATS Formel 3 Cup was the ninth edition of the German F3 Cup and the last one with FIA specification F3 engines. For the 2012 season, the series will use Volkswagen engines only. The season began on 23 April at Oschersleben and finished on 2 October at Hockenheim after nine race weekends, totalling eighteen races.

New Zealander Richie Stanaway clinched title on the penultimate round, becoming the first Kiwi to win the championship. Danish driver Marco Sørensen, despite missing the round at Assen, finished the season as runner-up. Third place was claimed by Austrian Klaus Bachler. Maxim Travin won the Trophy class after seven wins.

Teams and drivers

Calendar
The provisional 2011 calendar consisted of nine meetings of which five were due to take place in Germany. A support race to the World Series by Renault meeting at the Nürburgring was later dropped from the calendar in favour of an additional foreign round at Belgium's Spa-Francorchamps. The Rizla Race Day at Assen was also replaced with a Superleague Formula meeting at the circuit.

The final calendar consists of nine meetings of which seven are part of the ADAC Masters Weekend package.

Championship standings

Overall
Points were awarded as follows:

† — Drivers did not finish the race, but were classified as they completed over 90% of the race distance.

Trophy
Points were awarded as follows:

† — Drivers did not finish the race, but were classified as they completed over 90% of the race distance.

SONAX Rookie-Pokal

See also
 2011 Formula 3 Euro Series season

References

External links
 

German Formula Three Championship seasons
Formula Three
German
German Formula 3 Championship